Michaela Hrbková (born 14 July 1987) is a Czech handball player for Frisch Auf Göppingen and the Czech national team.

References

1987 births
Living people
Czech female handball players
Sportspeople from Olomouc
Expatriate handball players
Frisch Auf Göppingen players
Siófok KC players
Czech expatriate sportspeople in Croatia
Czech expatriate sportspeople in Germany
Czech expatriate sportspeople in Hungary